Sir Stephen Brown GBE, PC (born ) is a British retired judge. He was a Lord Justice of Appeal and the President of the Family Division of the High Court of England and Wales.

Early life and education
Brown was born on 3 October 1924 to Wilfrid Brown and Nora Elizabeth Brown of Longdon Green, Staffordshire. He was educated at Malvern College and Queens' College, Cambridge.

Career
From 1943 to 1946 Brown served in the Royal Navy Volunteer Reserve as a lieutenant.

Brown became a barrister at the Inner Temple in 1949, became a bencher in 1974, and became Treasurer in 1994. He was Deputy Chairman of Staffordshire Quarter Sessions from 1963 to 971, and Recorder of West Bromwich from 1965 to 971. He was appointed Queen's Counsel in 1966. He was a Recorder, and Honorary Recorder of West Bromwich from 1972 to 1975, was a High Court judge, in the Family Division, from 1975 to 1977, and in the Queen's Bench Division from 1977 to 1983, and was Presiding Judge of the Midland and Oxford Circuit from 1977 to 1981.

Brown became a Privy Counsellor in 1983 and was appointed a Lord Justice of Appeal (1983–88) and, finally, President of the Family Division (1988–99) of the High Court of England and Wales. On 19 November 1992, he delivered the landmark ruling that doctors treating Tony Bland, who had been in a persistent vegetative state since suffering serious brain damage in the Hillsborough disaster more than three years earlier, could withdraw food and treatment keeping him alive. Treatment was ultimately withdrawn on 22 February 1993, after the House of Lords rejected an appeal by the Official Solicitor, and Mr Bland died on 3 March 1993.

He was a member of the Parole Board of England and Wales from 1967 to 71, of the Butler Committee on mentally abnormal offenders from 1972 to 1975, and of the Advisory Council on Penal System in 1977. He was chairman of the Advisory Committee on Conscientious Objectors from 1971 to 1975. He was chairman of the Council of Malvern College from 1976 to 1994.

As of 10 January 2009, he is also a member of the Advisory Committee of Children's Rights International. He has served as president of several organisations: Edgbaston High School, 1989–; Malvernian Society, 1998–.

Honours and decorations
Brown was knighted in 1975. Brown was appointed a Knight Grand Cross of the Order of the British Empire in 1999.

He has received an honorary fellowship and several honorary degrees: 
 Honorary Fellow: Queens' College, Cambridge, 1984
 Honorary LLD: University of Birmingham, 1985 
 Honorary LLD: University of Leicester, 1997
 Honorary LLD, Honorary FRC Psychology: University of the West of England 2000.

Brown was appointed a Knight Grand Cross of the Order of the British Empire in 1999.

Personal life
In 1951, Brown married Patricia Ann Good, daughter of Richard Good from Tenbury Wells, Worcestershire. They had twin sons and three daughters. They lived in Harborne, Birmingham until Patricia died in January 2020.

References

External links
Who's Who 2009

1924 births
Living people
20th-century English judges
People educated at Malvern College
Alumni of Queens' College, Cambridge
Knights Bachelor
Knights Grand Cross of the Order of the British Empire
Members of the Privy Council of the United Kingdom
Family Division judges
Presidents of the Family Division
Royal Naval Volunteer Reserve personnel of World War II
Royal Navy officers of World War II